3D Realms is an American video game publisher and developer based in Garland, Texas. It was founded in 1987 as Apogee Software by Scott Miller to publish his game Kingdom of Kroz. Prior to Apogee's founding, Miller had released a few games he had developed himself, as well as a couple "packs" of games developed by himself and others, under a shareware distribution model whereby the games were distributed for free in return for donations. These games were inconsistently marketed under the name Apogee Software Productions, though after the company was founded they were sold under the Apogee Software name. Miller found that the standard shareware model was not viable for his games such as Beyond the Titanic (1986) and Supernova (1987), and beginning with Kroz the company pioneered the "Apogee model" of shareware distribution, wherein games were broken up into segments with the first part released for free to drive interest in the other monetized portions.

Soon after its founding, Apogee began publishing titles by other developers in addition to titles by Miller; these developers were often companies composed of a single designer. As Apogee expanded to include more people, some of these designers, such as George Broussard (Micro F/X Software) and Todd Replogle (Scenario Software), joined Apogee as employees and designed its later titles; Broussard joined the company in 1991 as a co-owner. In the 1990s, Apogee was best known for popularizing its shareware model and as the creator of franchises for MS-DOS on the personal computer such as Duke Nukem and as the publisher of games such as Commander Keen and Wolfenstein 3D.

In 1994, Apogee decided to launch different brand names for each genre of games they published; it created 3D Realms for 3D games, publishing Terminal Velocity in 1995 and developing the 1996 Duke Nukem 3D under the name, with the other titles released in those years still under Apogee. In late 1996, however, Apogee renamed the company itself to 3D Realms to associate their brand with newer, 3D titles. 3D Realms launched a brand for pinball games, Pinball Wizards, in February 1997, but only published Balls of Steel (1997) under the name. Also beginning in 1997, with their licensed Duke Nukem sequels, 3D Realms shifted from episodic MS-DOS titles to non-episodic console and personal computer games. In the process it abandoned the shareware model in favor of a traditional publishing model; it also largely ceased its activities as a developer that same year, releasing only Shadow Warrior (1997). The sole exceptions were Prey (2006), which stayed in development until 2001 when it was transferred to another studio, and Duke Nukem Forever (2011), which famously stayed in development at 3D Realms as vaporware until 2009.

In July 2008, 3D Realms licensed the Apogee name to the newly formed Apogee Software, which publishes both older Apogee titles and new games. In 2009, financial issues drove 3D Realms to shut down their development department and publishing operations, canceling Duke Nukem Forever and its publishing involvement in the already announced Earth No More and Prey 2. In 2014, 3D Realms itself, then focusing on licensing its franchises to other developers, was sold to the investment firm backing Interceptor Entertainment, one of those developers; since then it has published two titles for Interceptor and has two more planned under its new name of Slipgate Ironworks. In 2017, 3D Realms announced a return to development with a partnership for Shadow Stalkers, expected in 2018 but later canceled. 3D Realms has since published several titles, and is involved in the development of Wrath: Aeon of Ruin. During its history, 3D Realms has developed or published over 50 games, and granted licenses for 10 more. At least 25 games that 3D Realms was involved with were canceled, with some going on to be finished by other companies.

Video games
Many of the games published under the Apogee name were released as a set of separate episodes, which were purchasable and playable separately or as a group. Titles are listed for games that gave individual names to their episodes instead of episode numbers.

Games licensed by 3D Realms
Several spinoff games and remakes, especially in the Duke Nukem series, have been created with 3D Realms granting a license but without serving as the developer or publisher.

Canceled games
Several game projects were begun and abandoned before completion that had Apogee/3D Realms as the developer or publisher. Some of these were later completed by another developer or publisher, though many were not. In addition to these games, there are projects that were conceived but never began development, such as Dino Days (1991) and Commander Keen: The Universe is Toast! (1992), and titles which had preliminary agreements or offers for 3D Realms to publish where a final agreement was never reached either because the project was canceled or another publisher was chosen instead.

Notes

References

External links

3D Realms